London Buses route 23 is a Transport for London contracted bus route in London, England. Running between Westbourne Park station and Hammersmith, it is operated by London Transit.

History

Route 23 was introduced on 18 July 1992 between Westbourne Park station and  Liverpool Street bus station from First CentreWest's Westbourne Park garage. On 14 November 2003, Alexander ALX400 bodied Dennis Trident 2s replaced the AEC Routemasters that had operated it since its inception.

In January 2009, the route's peak frequency was reduced from twelve buses per hour to ten, as part of Transport for London's policy of reducing the number of buses using Oxford Street in order to reduce congestion and pollution by 10% in 2009 and a further 10% in 2010. The off-peak service already operated at this frequency. On 5 January 2009, a bus operating on the route crashed into a shop in Westbourne Grove after swerving to avoid a van, injuring ten people.

Later in 2009, Transport for London decided not to proceed with a possible change of the eastbound route in the Elgin Crescent area, following a consultation with residents and local interest groups. The proposal would have routed the eastbound 23 along Ladbroke Gardens instead of Elgin Crescent, while routes 52 and 452  would continue to run along Elgin Crescent in both directions. The most common benefit stated amongst supporters was fewer buses along the overcrowded Elgin Crescent; those opposing the change were concerned about safety at the junction of Ladbroke Grove and Ladbroke Gardens, and the suitability of Ladbroke Gardens to accommodate a bus service.

First London had successfully retained route 23 with a new contract starting on 13 November 2010 and was included in the sale of First London's Westbourne Park garage to Tower Transit on 22 June 2013.

Tower Transit successfully retained route 23 with a new contract starting on 14 November 2015. On 30 September 2017 route 23 was withdrawn between Aldwych and Liverpool Street bus station.

On 24 November 2018 as part of a programme to reduce the number of bus routes traversing Oxford Street, the section of route 23 between Marble Arch and Aldwych was diverted to Hammersmith, partly replacing route 10.

On 23 November 2022, it was announced that a proposed rerouting of route 23 at Hyde Park Corner to serve its previous terminus of Aldwych instead of Hammersmith, only now via Green Park, would be going ahead following a consultation; it will be implemented by the end of 2023.

In popular culture
Radio presenter Geoff Lloyd featured the route in the show Boring? The number 23 bus? Never! at the Boring Conference in December 2010.

Current route
Route 23 operates via these primary locations: 
Westbourne Park station 
Ladbroke Grove Sainsbury's 
Kensal House
Ladbroke Grove station 
Paddington station   
St Mary's Hospital
Marble Arch station  
Hyde Park Corner station  
Knightsbridge station  
Royal Albert Hall 
Kensington Palace 
High Street Kensington station  
Kensington Olympia station    
Brook Green
Hammersmith Broadway
Hammersmith bus station  for Hammersmith tube station

References

External links 

 

Bus routes in London
Transport in the London Borough of Hammersmith and Fulham
Transport in the Royal Borough of Kensington and Chelsea
Transport in the City of Westminster